Paul Reed (born June 14, 1999), nicknamed "BBall Paul", is an American professional basketball player for the Philadelphia 76ers of the National Basketball Association (NBA). He played college basketball for the DePaul Blue Demons.

Early life and high school career
Reed grew up in Orlando, Florida, and attended Wekiva High School. Reed grew from being 6'2" as a freshman in high school to 6'6" as a junior and was 6'8" by the start of his senior year. As a senior, he averaged 18.2 points and 11.4 rebounds and was named the Central Florida Player of the Year as he led the Mustangs to the state championship game. Rated a three-star recruit and the No. 235 prospect in his class, Reed committed to play college basketball at DePaul over offers from Clemson, Kansas State, Rutgers and Murray State.

College career
As a true freshman, Reed averaged 3.6 points, and 3.1 rebounds in 28 games played off the bench. He received more playing time towards the end of the season and averaged 5.6 points and 4.6 rebounds over the final 14 games of the season. As a sophomore, Reed averaged 12.3 points and a Big East Conference-leading 8.5 rebounds per game and was named the Big East Conference Most Improved Player. In the 2019 College Basketball Invitational Reed averaged 18.3 points, 10.3 rebounds, 2.7 blocks, and 2.2 steals as he helped lead the Blue Demons to the best-of-three final.

Reed entered his junior season as a preseason All-Big East selection. Reed recorded ten double-doubles and was named to the Big East Weekly Honor Roll four times during DePaul's 13-game non-conference schedule at the start of the season. Reed scored 23 points on 8-of-9 shooting with nine rebounds in DePaul's 79–66 upset of No. 5 Butler on January 18. Reed missed several games in February and March with a hip pointer injury. After the regular season, Reed was named Second Team All-Big East after averaging 15.1 points and finishing second in the conference in rebounds (10.7), blocks (2.6) and steals (1.9). He had 18 double-doubles for the season. After the season, Reed declared for the 2020 NBA draft, forgoing his final season of eligibility.

Professional career

Philadelphia 76ers (2020–present)
Reed was drafted in the second round with 58th overall selection in the 2020 NBA draft by the Philadelphia 76ers. On December 3, he signed with the 76ers on a two-way contract, meaning he would split time between the 76ers and their G League affiliate, the Delaware Blue Coats. Reed made his NBA debut on January 4, 2021, playing the final 90 seconds of the game and scoring two points on his sole field goal attempt in a 118–101 win over the Charlotte Hornets. Paul played with the Blue Coats during the shortened single-site G League season in 2021, where he won the league's Most Valuable Player and Rookie of the Year awards. 

On March 26, 2021, the 76ers announced that they had converted Reed to a standard NBA contract.

On November 27, 2022, Reed grabbed 13 rebounds and scored 12 points during a win over the Orlando Magic.

Career statistics

NBA

Regular season

|-
| style="text-align:left;"|
| style="text-align:left;"|Philadelphia
| 26 || 0 || 6.8 || .538 || .000 || .500 || 2.3 || .5 || .4 || .5 || 3.4
|-
| style="text-align:left;"|
| style="text-align:left;"|Philadelphia
| 38 || 2 || 7.9 || .563 || .250 || .429 || 2.4 || .4 || .9 || .4 || 3.1
|-
| style="text-align:center;" colspan="2"|Career
| 64 || 2 || 7.5 || .552 || .143 || .455 || 2.4 || .4 || .7 || .4 || 3.2

Playoffs

|-
| style="text-align:left;"|2021
| style="text-align:left;"|Philadelphia
| 3 || 0 || 3.7 || .500 || — || — || 2.7 || .0 || .0 || .3 || 1.3
|-
| style="text-align:left;"|2022
| style="text-align:left;"|Philadelphia
| 12 || 0 || 11.6 || .528 || .667 || .571 || 3.8 || .8 || .8 || .5 || 3.7
|-
| style="text-align:center;" colspan="2"|Career
| 15 || 0 || 10.0 || .535 || .667 || .571 || 3.6 || .7 || .6 || .5 || 2.0

College

|-
| style="text-align:left;"|2017–18
| style="text-align:left;"|DePaul
| 28 || 1 || 9.9 || .518 || .214 || .579 || 3.1 || .4 || .5 || .5 || 3.6
|-
| style="text-align:left;"|2018–19
| style="text-align:left;"|DePaul
| 36 || 28 || 26.9 || .562 || .405 || .770 || 8.5 || .9 || 1.1 || 1.5 || 12.3
|-
| style="text-align:left;"|2019–20
| style="text-align:left;"|DePaul
| 29 || 29 || 31.7 || .516 || .308 || .738 || 10.7 || 1.6 || 1.9 || 2.6 || 15.1
|- class="sortbottom"
| style="text-align:center;" colspan="2"|Career
| 93 || 58 || 23.2 || .535 || .330 || .739 || 7.5 || 1.0 || 1.2 || 1.5 || 10.6

Personal life 
Reed's father played college basketball at Old Dominion and UCF, then played professional basketball in Europe. He has four sisters.

References

External links
 DePaul Blue Demons bio

1999 births
21st-century African-American sportspeople
African-American basketball players
American men's basketball players
Basketball players from Orlando, Florida
Delaware Blue Coats players
DePaul Blue Demons men's basketball players
Living people
Philadelphia 76ers draft picks
Philadelphia 76ers players
Power forwards (basketball)